Chioma Ude is a Nigerian entertainment executive. In 2010, she founded Africa International Film Festival, a film festival held annually in Nigeria.

Career 
Ude founded AFRIFF in 2010, as a platform to train individuals in the film industry and then develop and monetize content for the public.
At the Nigerian entertainment conference, she stated that the inability of indigenous filmmakers to adequately convey the language, story, and cultural elements of Nigerians into film was responsible for their non-selection at the Academy Awards.  
In October 2016, she spoke with the corporate world about AFRIFF in Lagos, explaining that the aim is to raise awareness of the benefits and potential of African cinema.

Personal life 
Ude has a degree in marketing from University of Nigeria, Nsukka.

References 

Living people
Igbo people
University of Nigeria alumni
Year of birth missing (living people)
Nigerian philanthropists
Nigerian film producers
Nigerian media executives